Bombturbation is a type of soil disturbance created from extensive explosions, usually from battle or wars. The most prominent examples would be the battlefields of World War I. In the Battle of Verdun, most of the regional soil became bombturbation due to extreme bombardment. Bombturbation is a mixture of soil and explosive powder, creating a new type of soil. It exists under the categories of soils known as "impacturbation," and unlike the other forms of impacturbation, such as the ones formed from meteorite strikes, bombturbation is relatively common, as it occurs frequently in wars. Bombturbation is a very important factor in battlefield archeology, as modern battles can be studied through the thickness, frequentness, and nature of the bombturbation that is excavated.

References

 Introducing Bombturbation A Singular Type of Soil Disturbance and Mixing
 Bombturbation

See also
World War I

Battlefields
Archaeology articles needing expert attention